Trappist Dairy Limited is a small scale dairy producer in Hong Kong, with production based in Yuen Long.

It was founded in 1956 by Father Jen Stanislus of the Trappist Haven Monastery, on Lantau Island, and the dairy was initially operated by Trappist Haven of Tai Shui Hang.

The dairy processing operations are managed by Lark International Dairy Holdings Limited.

Trappist milk products are sold in the traditional glass bottles as well as cardboard cartons.

In 2015, batches of Trappist Dairy milk were withdrawn from sale due to safety tests detecting “excessive bacteria”.

See also
 Trappist Haven Monastery
 Dairy Farm International Holdings Limited
 Kowloon Dairy

References

External links
 

Dairy farming in Hong Kong
Dairy products companies of Hong Kong
Trappist Order
Food and drink companies established in 1956
1956 establishments in Hong Kong